Epitragini is a tribe of darkling beetles in the subfamily Pimeliinae of the family Tenebrionidae. There are more than 30 genera in Epitragini, found in the North, Central, and South America.

Genera
These genera belong to the tribe Epitragini

 Aspidolobus Redtenbacher, 1868  (the Neotropics)
 Bothrotes Casey, 1907  (North America and the Neotropics)
 Conoecus Horn, 1885  (North America)
 Cyrtomius Casey, 1907  (the Neotropics)
 Ecnomosternum Gebien, 1928  (the Neotropics)
 Epitragella Kulzer, 1958  (the Neotropics)
 Epitragodes Casey, 1890  (North America and the Neotropics)
 Epitragopsis Casey, 1907  (the Neotropics)
 Epitragosoma Brown & Triplehorn, 2002  (North America)
 Epitragus Latreille, 1802  (the Neotropics)
 Eunotiodes Casey, 1907  (the Neotropics)
 Geoborus Blanchard, 1842  (the Neotropics)
 Hemasodes Casey, 1907  (the Neotropics)
 Hypselops Solier, 1851  (the Neotropics)
 Kaszabus Freude, 1967  (the Neotropics)
 Lobometopon Casey, 1907  (North America and the Neotropics)
 Metopoloba Casey, 1907  (North America)
 Nyctopetus Guérin-Méneville, 1831  (the Neotropics)
 Omopheres Casey, 1907  (the Neotropics)
 Ortheolus Casey, 1907  (the Neotropics)
 Parepitragus Casey, 1907  (the Neotropics)
 Pechalius Casey, 1907  (North America and the Neotropics)
 Pectinepitragus Pic, 1927  (the Neotropics)
 Penaus Freude, 1968  (the Neotropics)
 Phegoneus Casey, 1907  (North America and the Neotropics)
 Phitophilus Guérin-Méneville, 1831  (the Neotropics)
 Polemiotus Casey, 1907  (North America and the Neotropics)
 Pseudortheolus Freude, 1968  (the Neotropics)
 Pseudothinobatis Bouchard & Bousquet, 2021  (the Neotropics)
 Schoenicus Leconte, 1866  (North America and the Neotropics)
 Stictodere Gebien, 1928  (the Neotropics)
 Tapinocomus Gebien, 1928  (the Neotropics)
 Tydeolus Champion, 1884  (the Neotropics)

References

Further reading

External links

 

Pimeliinae